Siavash or Siyavash is an Iranian male given name. It was popularized by Siyâvash or Siavash, a legendary prince who is a major figure in Ferdowsi's epic, the Shahnameh.

Notable people with the name Siavash, Siyâvash, or various other transliterations from Persian/Farsi/Azerbaijani languages include:

Siyawush, Iranian officer who served as the head of the Sasanian army during the second reign of the Sasanian shah Kavad I (r. 498–531)
Siyavakhsh, Iranian aristocrat from the House of Mihran who was descended from Bahram Chobin, the famous spahbed of the Sasanian Empire

Siavash Akbarpour, Iranian football player and coach
Siavash Alamouti, Iranian scientist
Siavash Daneshvar, Iranian activist
Siavash Ghomayshi, Iranian musician, singer and song writer
Siavash Hagh Nazari, Iranian professional footballer 
Siavash Kasrai, Iranian poet, literary critic and novelist
Siavash Shahshahani, Iranian mathematician
Siavash Shams, Iranian singer, songwriter, record producer
Siavash Yazdani, Iranian professional footballer 

Siyâvush Beg Gorji, Iranian illustrator of Georgian origin
Siyavush Novruzov, Azerbaijani politician

See also

Siyavuş Pasha, several Ottoman persons

References

Persian masculine given names